Yannick Bru (born 22 May 1973) is a French rugby union coach, currently serving as head coach at Union Bordeaux Bègles in the Top 14. Bru was capped 18 times for the French national side.

At Toulouse Bru twice won the Heineken Cup, in 2003 when he started, and 2005 as a replacement, as well as winning the Top 14 title in 1999 and 2001. Bru has also been capped 18 times for France, including their grand slam at the 2002 and 2004 Six Nations Championship, as well as being a part of their 2003 World Cup squad.

Bru will left Toulouse at the end of the 2011–12 season to join the staff of the French national team as forwards coach.

References

External links
Yannick Bru on sporting-heroes.net
Yannick Bru on rwc2003.irb.com

Yannick Bru on ercrugby.com

1973 births
Living people
People from Auch
French rugby union players
Rugby union hookers
France international rugby union players
Stade Toulousain players
French rugby union coaches
Sportspeople from Gers